A Deputy of the Governor General is, per the Constitution Act, 1867, one of any individuals appointed by the Governor General of Canada, with the Canadian monarch's consent, to act in his or her stead, exercising any powers so delegated to them by the governor general generally limited to all abilities save for dissolving parliament, namely, granting royal assent to bills passed by parliament, signing orders in council, issuing royal proclamations, or receiving the credentials of newly appointed ambassadors to Canada.

Currently, the secretary to the governor general, the deputy secretary to the governor general, and the justices of the supreme court are called upon to act as deputies of the governor general; when the latter are acting in this capacity, they are addressed as The Honourable the Deputy of Her Excellency the Governor General. The deputy's commission will read as follows:

Administrator of Canada

The role of Deputy of the Governor General is separate from that of Administrator of Canada. The letters patent of 1947 issued by King George VI provide that, in the case of the death, removal, incapacity, or absence of more than one month of the governor general, the Chief Justice of Canada shall serve as Administrator of Canada, exercising all the powers and functions of the governor general until a new governor general is appointed. In the absence or incapacity of the chief justice, the role of administrator falls on the senior Puisne Justice of the Supreme Court.

References

Government of Canada